Francis Lyndhurst was an English theatrical scenery painter, film producer and film director, who set up an early film studio at Shoreham-by-Sea, West Sussex.

Lyndhurst's first films, beginning with The Showman’s Dream in 1914, were made at Shoreham Fort by his production company (called Sealite or Sunny South Film Company - sources vary). The next year, set up the Glasshouse Studio in a nearby, glass-sided, building. The business failed and Lyndhurst returned to his former occupation of scenery painting.

During World War II the barn in which Lyndhurst stored his films was destroyed by bombing. No copies of any of his films are known to survive.

Lyndhurst had four grandchildren, one of whom is the actor Nicholas Lyndhurst.

References 

English film directors
English film producers
People from Shoreham-by-Sea